Eye of the Storm is a 1991 German-American romantic thriller, directed by Yuri Zeltser.

Plot
At a highway gas station/motel where they live, two young brothers witness their parents murder. The younger brother is blinded in the same incident. Ten years later both brothers are still there and the tragedy may have turned one of them psychotic: customers never check out. When the abusive Gladstone and his young and sexy wife are stranded at the gas station it brings out the worst in everyone.

Cast

Reception
Radio Times rated it 2 out of 5 stars.

References

External links
 
 

1991 films
American romantic thriller films
German romantic thriller films
1990s romantic thriller films
Films scored by Christopher Franke
English-language German films
Films directed by Yuri Zeltser
1990s German films